Rimbey Airport  is located  north of Rimbey, Alberta, Canada.

References

External links
Place to Fly on COPA's Places to Fly airport directory

Registered aerodromes in Alberta
Ponoka County